The 1967 Copa Perú season is the promotion tournament of Peruvian football.

In this tournament after many qualification rounds, each one of the 24 political departments of Peru qualifies a team. Those teams, plus the team relegated from the First Division at the end of the previous season, play in two more rounds. Finally six of the clubs qualify for the Final round, staged in Lima (the capital).

As a result of the Peru Cup, four teams were promoted to play in 1967 Torneo Descentralizado, which had been expanded from 10 to 14 teams/clubs.

Finalists teams
The following list shows the teams that qualified for the Regional Stage.

Final stage

Final group stage

Round 1

Round 2

Round 3

Round 4

Round 5

External links
  Copa Peru 1967
  Semanario Pasión

Copa Perú seasons
Cop